KCAT (1340 AM, The Cat) is a radio station broadcasting an urban oldies format. Licensed to Pine Bluff, Arkansas, United States. The station is currently owned by Jay and Devon Brentlinger, through licensee Broadcast Industry Group, LLC.

History
Before airing its urban gospel format, KCAT aired an urban contemporary format.

On March 22, 2021, KCAT changed their format from gospel to urban oldies, branded as "The Cat".

References

External links

CAT
Urban oldies radio stations in the United States